Silvère Ackermann (born 30 December 1984) is a Swiss former cyclist.

Major results
2007
 3rd Tour du Jura
 6th Overall Tour Alsace
 7th Overall Rhône-Alpes Isère Tour
2008
 5th Tour du Jura
 9th GP du canton d'Argovie
2009
 5th Tour du Jura

References

1984 births
Living people
Swiss male cyclists
Cyclists from Montreal